San José Independencia is a town and municipality in Oaxaca in south-western Mexico. The municipality covers an area of 58.75 km2. It is part of the Tuxtepec District of the Papaloapan Region.

In 2005, the municipality had a total population of 3689.

References

Municipalities of Oaxaca